Blake Young-Fountain (born September 13, 1981) is an American actor and producer. He's known for his roles in Grownish, The Mindy Project and The Skinny (2012).

Early life 
Young-Fountain grew up in both St. Louis, Missouri, and Norwalk, Connecticut; his parents worked in the fashion industry. His mother was a fan of the soap opera Dynasty and named him after her favorite character - Blake Carrington. He studied at New York University Tisch School, graduating with double majors in both Drama (BA) and Journalism (BA).

Filmography 
 America's Most Wanted: America Fights Back (1988), Rashawn Brazell
 The Houseboy (2007), Blake
 Blueprint (2007), Keith
 Perception (2009), Interviewer
 Chasing The Green (2009), Carl
 The Real Deal (2009), D'Vaughn Murray
 2 Broke Girls (2011) (TV Series), Bro#2, "And the 90's Horse Party" episode
 Parenthood (2011) (TV Series), Arnie/Bradely's Friend#2; 'Amazing Andy and His Wonderful World of Bugs' and 'Damage Control' (2 episodes) 
 The Skinny (2012), Sebastian
 Let Clay Be Clay (2013), Young Cassius
 The Mindy Project (2013) (TV Series), Singing Waiter; "Mindy's Birthday" episode
 Filthy Sexy Teen$ (2013) (TV Movie), Shoemaker
 Michael (2015), Chris
 Griot's Lament (2014), Salb, "Griot's Lament Webisode III"
Purple Dots (2016), Producer
Falling For Angels (2017), Terick, "Leimert Park" episode
Grownish (2018), Jerome, "Erase Your Social"; "Starboy" episodes
Marlon (2018), Dustin, "Homecoming" episode
Dear White People, (2018), Man, "Volume II: Chapter VIII" episode
Pet Peeves, (2018), Brandon,
SK & J, (2018), George Michael, "First Pitch" episode
Now What (2019), Daryl, "Counter Clockwise" episode

Production
 Griot's Lament (2014), Associate Producer
Purple Dots (2016), Producer
Make the Moon Trailer (2017), Producer, Costume Designer

References 

1981 births
Living people
American male film actors
American gay actors
Tisch School of the Arts alumni
Male actors from Cleveland
Male models from Ohio
Male actors from St. Louis